The Berlin Prize is a residential fellowship at the Hans Arnhold Center, awarded by the American Academy in Berlin.

Fellows of the American Academy in Berlin 

2021-2022 Winners

2020-2021 Winners

2019-2020 Winners

All past winners of the Berlin Prize

References
https://web.archive.org/web/20110113151627/http://www.americanacademy.de/home/about-us/hans-arnhold-center/
http://www.americanacademy.de/fellows-distinguished-visitors/alumni/fellows/

Fellowships
Awards established in 1998
Education in Berlin